John Ker was a Canadian Anglican priest, most notably  Archdeacon of St Andrews in the Diocese of Montreal.

Ker was educated at Trinity College, Toronto and ordained in 1876. After a curacy at  Glen Sutton he held incumbencies at Dunham, Quebec and Pointe-Saint-Charles. In 1902 he became an Archdeacon.

References

19th-century Canadian Anglican priests
20th-century Canadian Anglican priests
Archdeacons of St Andrews, PQ
University of Toronto alumni